Zig may refer to:

Ziz or Zig, a giant griffin-like bird in Jewish mythology
Zığ, Baku, Azerbaijan
Zig, Iran, a village in Razavi Khorasan Province, Iran
Zig (programming language), a general-purpose programming language designed for robustness, optimality, and maintainability
Zoster-immune globulin

People
Glenn Danzig, American musician
One half of Australian comedy duo Zig and Zag (Australian performers)
Zig Ziglar, American self-help author and speaker
Pen name of Eliza Archard Conner

In fiction
The space ship from the video game Zero Wing
One half of the puppet comedy duo Zig and Zag (puppets)
One of the main characters from the French comic strip Zig et Puce
Zigs (film), a 2001 gambling film directed by Mars Callahan

See also
Zigzag (disambiguation)

ja:ジグ#zig